Eucyclodes sanguilineata is a moth of the family Geometridae first described by Frederic Moore in 1868. It is found in Bengal in what is now India and Bangladesh.

References

Moths described in 1868
Geometrinae
Moths of Asia